The Ropewalk pumping station was built on the Ropewalk in Nottingham in 1850. It is a Grade II listed building.

History
It was built by the Nottingham Waterworks Company in 1850 along with a reservoir on Park Row in Nottingham.

The Ropewalk pumping station fell into disuse around 1880 when it was found that the water which it was supplying was contaminated by Nottingham General Cemetery. It supplied  of water per day, and analysis in 1873 showed that it contained  of solid effluent per gallon.

The building was used as a garage from 1930.

References

Grade II listed buildings in Nottinghamshire
Industrial buildings completed in 1850
Water supply pumping stations
Buildings and structures in Nottingham
1850 establishments in England